Selahattin Torkal (1925 – 16 November 2010) was a Turkish footballer. He competed in the men's tournament at the 1948 Summer Olympics.

References

External links
 

1925 births
2010 deaths
Turkish footballers
Turkey international footballers
Olympic footballers of Turkey
Footballers at the 1948 Summer Olympics
Footballers from Istanbul
Association football defenders
Fenerbahçe S.K. footballers
Turkish football managers
Fenerbahçe football managers
Fatih Karagümrük S.K. managers